Vinti Idnani is an Indian television actress, who has appeared in Hindi television series, like Bade Achhe Lagte Hain, Dil Dosti Dance, and Ek Tha Chander Ek Thi Sudha. Currently, she is seen in Jaane Kya Hoga Rama Re as of March 2016.

Filmography
Uvaa
Main Tera Hero as Train Girl

Television
Sony TV's Bade Achhe Lagte Hain as Myrah Ram Kapoor
Star Plus's Ek Hazaaron Mein Meri Behna Hai special appearance as Vishakha (performance on Bole Chudiyan) 
Channel V's Dil Dosti Dance as Vishakha
Life OK's Ek Tha Chander Ek Thi Sudha & Jaane Kya Hoga Rama Re as Nandini/Nandu/
Star Plus's Arjun (TV series) as Dolly (Episode 103)
Zing's Pyaar tune Kya kiya (TV series) as Tanya (Episode 21)

References

External links

Living people
Indian television actresses
Actresses from Mumbai
Actresses in Hindi television
1991 births